Sango may refer to:

Ethnicities and languages
 Sango people, an ethnic group of the Central African Republic
 Sango language, a language of the Central African Republic

Places
 Sangō, Nara, a town in Nara Prefecture, Japan
 Sango, Zimbabwe, a town in Zimbabwe
 Sango Pond, site of Natuashish, Newfoundland and Labrador
 The local name for the town within the Eidghah valley of Pakistan

Other
 Sango or Shango, a Yoruba thunder god
 Sango (film), a 1997 Nigerian film
 Sango (musician), an electronic musician and DJ from Seattle, Washington
 Sango (InuYasha), a character in the manga and anime InuYasha
 Sango (ToHeart2), one of the Himeyuri twins in the game ToHeart2

See also
 Sangu (disambiguation)
 Songo (disambiguation)